Ellis Johnson may refer to:

Ellis Johnson (defensive lineman) (born 1973), former American football defensive tackle for the Indianapolis Colts, Atlanta Falcons and Denver Broncos
Ellis Johnson (American football coach) (born 1951), current defensive coordinator for the Auburn Tigers, formerly head American college football coach for the Southern Mississippi Golden Eagles and the Citadel Bulldogs
Ellis T. Johnson (1910–1990), former American college football head coach for the Morehead State Eagles
Ellis Johnson Arena, arena in Morehead, Kentucky, named after same
Ellis Johnson (Brookside), a character from the British television series Brookside
Ellis L. Johnson, Coca-Cola chair professor for Georgia Tech's School of ISyE
Ellis Johnson (baseball) (1892–1965), pitcher in Major League Baseball